Adebayo Akinde is an academic and bishop in Nigeria.

He was born in Kaduna on 25 August 1946. He was educated at Obafemi Awolowo University; University College, London; and the University of Sussex. He was on the staff of Obafemi Awolowo University from 1973 to 2002, specializing in electronic engineering and computing. Akinde was ordained deacon in 1979 and priest in 1981. In 1992, he became a Canon and the following year an Archdeacon. He was Provost of the Cathedral of St. Peter, Abeokuta from  2000 until 2006. He was Bishop of Lagos Mainland and Archbishop of Lagos, retiring in 2016.

He became Archbishop of Lagos Province on 19 January 2013.

He was elected pioneer Bishop of Lagos Mainland during the Episcopal Synod on 28 June 2006, at All Saints Church, Wuse, Abuja.

Notes

University of Ibadan alumni
Living people
People from Kaduna
Anglican bishops of Lagos Mainland
21st-century Anglican bishops in Nigeria
21st-century Anglican archbishops
Anglican archbishops of Lagos
Obafemi Awolowo University alumni
Academic staff of Obafemi Awolowo University
Alumni of University College London
Alumni of the University of Sussex
1946 births
Nigerian computer scientists
Nigerian electronic engineers
Anglican provosts in Africa
Church of Nigeria archdeacons